The thick-tailed shrew (Crocidura brunnea) is a species of mammal in the family Soricidae. It is found on the islands of Java and Bali in Indonesia.

References

Mammals described in 1888